The 1958 Pau Grand Prix was a Formula Two motor race held on 7 April 1958 at the Pau circuit, in Pau, Pyrénées-Atlantiques, France. The Grand Prix was won by Maurice Trintignant, driving the Cooper T43. Hermano da Silva Ramos finished second and Giulio Cabianca third.

Classification

Race

References

Pau Grand Prix
1958 in French motorsport